The World Juggling Federation (WJF) is the world's only organization devoted to the promotion and advancement of juggling as a sport (competitive juggling).

History
In 2000, long-time IJA member Jason Garfield founded the WJF.  Garfield attracted interest and membership by framing the skills of juggling as a sport. The WJF broadcast its first juggling convention on ESPN2 in January 2005 and its second convention on ESPN later the same year. In 2021, the WJF was reestablished as a 501(c)(3) organization and announced its goal to create a juggling event at the Olympics.

Competition
The WJF's most well-known event is the WJF convention, which has been broadcast on ESPN2. The organization  encourages jugglers to compete against each other in order to get better. In WJF-sponsored events, the participants use juggling props, which include: Balls, Rings, Clubs, Cigar boxes, Diabolos, and Devil Sticks.

WJF competition events sometimes include (pending enough competitors attending):
Club passing
360s (and similar)
Endurance
Isolated Endurance
Freestyle
Extreme Competitions
There are "junior"-, "beginner"-, "intermediate"- and "advanced"-level competitors in each of the three main WJF  disciplines.

Conventions and championships
Annual WJF conventions are held; and juggling competitions produce annual winners who are named "overall champions". At WJF 5, the top competition event ran alongside the Battle for the WJF Presidency, with Thomas Dietz as the inaugural winner, beating Jason Garfield. However, Dietz resigned from presidency soon after, saying he didn't have time to fulfill his duties as president. At WJF 7 in 2011, Doug Sayers was initially named overall champion, but due to a miscount of the scores this was proved not to be the case, as Vova had scored more points overall.

References

External links
World Juggling Federation official website
Competition results
WJF on YouTube

Juggling